The 1942 Williams Ephs football team represented the Williams College as an independent during the 1942 college football season. In Charlie Caldwell's 15th and final year at Williams, the Ephs compiled a 7–1 record, shutting out three teams, and outscored opponents 256 to 46. After winning their first seven contests, the Ephs made a quick appearance on the AP Poll for the first and only time in program history. Williams lost the last game of the season against rival  and fell from the rankings.

Schedule

References

Williams
Williams Ephs football seasons
Williams Ephs football